Ilene Hamann (born 9 June 1984) is a South African actress and model.

Early life 
Ilene Hamann was born in Jeffreys Bay, where she lived until she moved to Cape Town, South Africa.  Her mother is of Portuguese descent and her father of Dutch descent. Hamann started her career with photography, which earned her several modeling offers, which she pursued.

Hamann attended Nico Malan High School, and Matriculated with a B aggregate. After her matriculation, she went to Stellenbosch Academy of Design and Photography, where she completed her first year in photography but had to give up her studies due to the amount of modeling work she was receiving.

Career

Film 
Hamann began her film career in Bollywood with Rog, making her the first South African model to be cast in such a leading role.

Filmography

References

External links
 

1984 births
Living people
People from Kouga Local Municipality
Afrikaner people
South African people of Dutch descent
South African people of Portuguese descent
South African film actresses
South African female models
South African expatriate actresses in India
Actresses in Hindi cinema
21st-century South African women
21st-century South African actresses